Santa Bárbara is a town and municipality in the Nariño Department, Colombia. Its municipal seat is known as Iscuandé.

Climate
Santa Bárbara has a tropical rainforest climate (Köppen Af) with very heavy rainfall year-round.

References

Municipalities of Nariño Department